Carnival of Souls (also billed as Wes Craven Presents 'Carnival of Souls') is a 1998 American horror film, a remake of Herk Harvey's 1962 horror film of the same name, although it has very little in common with the story of the original. It stars Bobbie Phillips and comedian Larry Miller, and was directed by Adam Grossman and Ian Kessner. It was executive produced by Wes Craven.

Plot 

Although this film is a remake of 1962's Carnival of Souls, it bears little resemblance to the original aside from the ending. This film centers on Alex Grant (Bobbie Phillips) who witnesses a carnival clown named Louis Seagram (Larry Miller) raping and murdering her mother on January 24, 1977. Twenty years later, Seagram returns after being released from prison and attacks Alex in her car. She drives the car into the river, and as she struggles back to shore she has hallucinations of Seagram and the same carnival where she met him. Alex is then drawn into a ghoulish game of cat and mouse with Seagram at the carnival.

Cast

Release 
Carnival of Souls was released on August 21, 1998, on a limited theatrical run, and eventually came direct-to-video in the United States and other territories.

The film was released on DVD by Lions Gate on February 23, 1999. It was later released by VCI on January 15, 2001, and by Cinema Club on December 31 that same year.

Reception 
On Rotten Tomatoes, the film holds an approval rating of 20% based on five reviews, with a weighted average rating of 4.1/10.
Shawn Handling from HorrorNews.net stated that, although the film was "a decent little fright picture" and its style made up for its lack of originality, Handling criticized the film's "run-of the-mill" performances, writing, predictable story, lack of scares, and choice of music. TV Guide awarded the film 1/5 stars, calling the film "dismal", writing, "Though filled with modern-day horror contrivances, Grossman's film evokes none of the haunting atmosphere that distinguished Herk Harvey's eerily timeless original."

References

External links 

Carnival of Souls at FEARnet

1998 films
1998 horror films
American horror films
Remakes of American films
Films set in 1977
Films set in 1997
Horror film remakes
Films about rape
Trimark Pictures films
Horror films about clowns
1990s English-language films
1990s American films